Tribonema is a genus of filamentous, freshwater yellow-green algae.   The holotype for the genus is the species Tribonema bombycina (C.Agardh) Derbès & Solier.

Species recorded from Ireland include: Tribonema affine (G.S.West) G.S. West; T. minus (G.A. Klebs) Hazen and T. viride Pascher.

References

Heterokont genera
Xanthophyceae